Rogna is a rural locality (a village) in Sibirskoye Rural Settlement, Verkhovazhsky District, Vologda Oblast, Russia. The population was 410 as of 2002. There are 8 streets.

Geography 
Rogna is located 49 km southeast of Verkhovazhye (the district's administrative centre) by road. Studentsovo is the nearest rural locality.

References 

Rural localities in Verkhovazhsky District